Tabernanthe is a genus of flowering plants in the family Apocynaceae, first described as a genus in 1888. It is native to tropical central Africa.

Species
 Tabernanthe elliptica  (Stapf) Leeuwenb. - Congo-Brazzaville, Zaire, Angola
 Tabernanthe iboga Baill. - Cameroon, Central African Republic, Gabon, Cabinda, Congo-Brazzaville, Zaire, Angola

References

Apocynaceae genera
Flora of Africa
Rauvolfioideae
Taxa named by Henri Ernest Baillon